Certus Gearless Company Ltd. was a British manufacturer of automobiles.

History

The company was founded in London in 1907. The brand name was Certus. Only a few units were produced, and production ended in 1908.

Models

The smaller model used a two-cylinder engine. A larger model was propelled by a 4-cylinder engine from Aster with a displacement of 3000 cm³. The distinguishing feature of both models was the use of a friction drive.

References
 Harald Linz, Halwart Schrader: Die Internationale Automobil-Enzyklopädie. United Soft Media Verlag, München 2008, . 
 George N. Georgano: The Beaulieu Encyclopedia of the Automobile. Volume 1: A–F. Fitzroy Dearborn Publishers, Chicago 2001, .

Defunct motor vehicle manufacturers of England
Vehicle manufacture in London
Defunct companies based in London